The Untold may refer to:

The Untold (film)
The Untold, a radio programme on BBC Radio 4 presented by Grace Dent